This article contains the details of the pavilions in Expo 2015.  The 2015 World Expo Milan covers more than 2.9 square kilometers and contains more than 70 exposition pavilions. More than 145 countries and 50 international organizations registered to participate in the 2015 Milan Expo.

Theme pavilions

There are 5 theme areas:
 , which serves as an introduction to the Expo;
 Future Food District which displays a modern and hyper-technological supermarket
 Children's park, an area dedicated to kids exploring the Expo theme
 a Biodiversity Park which includes a garden and two pavilions
 Arts & Foods: rituals since 1851 exhibition hosted at the satellite venue Triennale di Milano.

In addition the Media Center, which looks exactly like Pavilion Zero, welcomes visitors at the west entrance of the exhibition.

National pavilions

145 of the world's 196 nations were represented at Expo 2015, either in stand-alone pavilions or within larger pavilions.

{|class="wikitable sortable"
|-
!Country
!Image
!Designer
!Description
!Award(s)
|-
|

Afghanistan
||||||Eating for Longevity, Afghanistan Amazingly Real, a 125-metre section within the Spices cluster.||
|-
|

Albania
||||||Our Food, Our Story, Our Mystery... within the Bio-Mediterraneum cluster||
|-
|

Algeria
||||||This pavilion's theme was Agricultural Heritage and Technological Development for Food Self-Sufficiency and describes how difficult hunting and obtaining water is in its arid conditions. There was also a food area which served cous cous and other offerings from the national cuisine.||
|-
|

Angola
|||||||| BIE award 2nd place for theme development (over 2000 metres) 1st prize of the World Association of Agronomists
|-
|

Argentina
||||||Theme 'Argentina feeds you'. The pavilion was designed to resemble four silos||
|-
|

Austria
|||| Klaus K. Loenhart of terrain:loenhart&mayr||The pavilion was a lush outdoor forest, giving visitors the opportunity to meander through and enjoy a breath of fresh air.|| Exhibitor Magazine best pavilion honorable mention Exhibitor Magazine best interpretation of theme honorable mention
 BIE award winner for best display (under 2000 metres)

|-
|

Azerbaijan
|| 
| Simmetrico Network 
|
Theme 'Protection of Organic Food and Biodiversity for Future Generations' 
|  Exhibitor Magazine best small pavilion winnerHonorable mention sustainability award for Design and Materials
|-
|

Bahrain
||||Designed by Anne Holtrop and Anouk Vogel||Contained 10 connected fruit gardens||Honorable mention sustainability award for Design and Materials BIE award 2nd place for architecture and landscape (over 2000 metres)

|-
|

Bangladesh
||||||
Theme 'Sustainability in Rice Production for Better Life Under Changing Climate' Includes information about rice capable of adapting to climate change developed by the Bangladesh Rice Research Institute
|
|-
|

Belarus
||||||Theme: The Wheel of Life||
|-
|

Belgium
||||Designed by Patrick Genard in collaboration with Marc Belderbos, construction by Besix - Vanhout||||Exhibitor Magazine best exhibit honorable mention for The CaveHonorable mention sustainability award for Design and Materials
|-
|

Benin
||||||Theme: At the Heart of Benin's Cuisine, Nutrition for a Life Bursting with Energy||
|-
|

Bolivia
||||||Theme: Quinoa, a Future Sown Thousands of Years Ago||
|-
|

Brazil
||||Studio Arthur Casas||||Exhibitor Magazine best 'Elements & Detail' honorable mention for The Net
|-
|

Brunei
||||||Theme Science and Technology for Food Safety, Security and Quality. Part of the spices cluster||
|-
|

Burundi
||||||Theme A Discovery of the Five Senses: Burundi, part of the coffee cluster||
|-
|

Chile 
||

||Undurraga Devés Arquitectos||The pavilion is a wooden box: a suspended structure with a large wooden lintel enclosed by a frame of crossed beams and supported by four concrete pillars that create an intermediate space and a clear horizon.|| BIE award 2nd place for architecture and landscape (under 2000 metres)
|-
|

China
||||Studio Link-Arc||The building's predominant feature is its complex roof form. From the front it appears to be a series of curves, while at the back it forms a row of rectilinear shapes.||Exhibitor Magazine' best exterior design honorable mention BIE award 3rd place for architecture and landscape (over 2000 metres)
|-
|

Colombia
||||Theme Concept: Mauricio Cárdenas, Studio Cárdenas; Architecture Concept: Manuel Villa Arquitectos; Architectural Design: Mauricio Cárdenas, Studio Cárdenas||The Colombia Pavilion theme was "Naturally Sustainable", a concept that was experienced throughout the exhibition of the five thermal floors the country has: hot, temperate, cold, moorland and perennial snow. The possibility of having a stable temperature during 365 days, allows the country to be a constant food producer, a breadbasket of the world. The archietecture of the pavilion was inspired in Colombia's geography having 4 modules of different height and extension.||Colombia Pavilion received second place in the category "Best heritage for future generations" special prize given by the World Association of Agronomists at the Class Expo Pavilion Heritage Award.
|-
|

Czech Republic
||||Chybík + Kristof|||| BIE award 3rd place for architecture and landscape (under 2000 metres)
|-
|

Dominican Republic
||||||Theme: Empowering Family Farmers so They Can Feed Themselves, Their Communities, and the World and part of the coffee cluster. The pavilion was run by the Laboratorio de Arquitectura Dominicana (LAD)
||
|-
|

Egypt
||||||Theme EGYPT, the Never Ending Story||
|-
|

Estonia
||||Kadarik Tüür Arhitektid||Theme Gallery of
| BIE award 3rd place for best display (under 2000 metres)
|-
|

France
|||XTU Architects||||Exhibitor Magazine editor's choice honorable mention BIE award winner for architecture and landscape (over 2000 metres)
|-
|

Germany
||||Schmidhuber||The German pavilion attempted to reproduce the landscape of the typical rural areas of its country; stylized trees emerged from the ground alongside the external exhibition area. The largest pavilion at Expo 2015
| Exhibitor Magazine best pavilion winner
 Exhibitor Magazine best activity/interactive winner for Seed Boards
Exhibitor Magazine best use of technology honorable mention for Photovoltaic Cells
 BIE award winner for theme development (over 2000 metres)

|-
|

Guatemala
||||||Theme The Heart of the Mayan World. Part of the coffee cluster.||
|-
|

Hungary
|||| Attila Ertsey and Herczeg Ágnes Sándor Sárkány||Theme From The Purest Sources||
|-
|

India
||||||India participated via the Basmati pavilion in the rice cluster||
|-
|

Indonesia
||||||Theme The stage of the world||
|-
|

Iran
|||||||| BIE award 2nd place for best display (under 2000 metres)
|-
|

Ireland
|||||||| BIE award 3rd place for theme development (under 2000 metres)
|-
|

Israel
|| || David Knafo||The Israeli pavilion introduced the technological agriculture in Israel, was called "Fields of Tomorrow", and its presenter was Israeli Moran Atias||Exhibitor Magazine best exterior design honorable mentionHonorable mention sustainability award for Design and Materials
|-
|

Italy
||||Nemesi & Partners||||
|-
|

Japan
|
|Hakuhodo Design Inc.
|The pavilions symbol was 6 iwaibashi (chopsticks with two thin ends) arranged to form an 'E'

The pavilion was designed to represent a 'bowl of diversity' and constructed with three-dimensional wooden grid made by combining traditional Japanese wooden framework with recent understanding of compressive strain
|  Exhibitor Magazine best presentation winner for Harmony BIE award winner for best installation (over 2000 metres)
|-
|

Kazakhstan
||||Facts and Fiction GmbH||||Exhibitor Magazine best activity/interactive honorable mention for Interactive Floor Relief Exhibitor Magazine editor's choice winner BIE award 3rd place for theme development (over 2000 metres)
|-
|

Kuwait
||||||||Exhibitor Magazine best 'Elements & Detail' honorable mention for Dhow SailsExhibitor Magazine people's choice honorable mention
|-
|

Lebanon
||||||Theme: Cuisine: the Lebanese Art & Soul, part of the Bio-Mediterraneum cluster.||
|-
|

Lithuania
||||||Theme: Well of Knowledge: Experienced Future ||
|-
|

Malaysia
||||||Theme Towards a Sustainable Food EcosystemThe pavilion comprises 4 structures designed to resemble seeds, and made is from glued laminated timber||
|-
|

Mexico
||||Francisco Lopez Guerra||The pavilion is a volume wrapped by structures that resemble the dried corn husks||Exhibitor Magazine best use of technology honorable mention for Bar Code StickersExhibitor Magazine editor's choice honorable mention BIE award 2nd place for theme development (under 2000 metres)
|-
|

Monaco
||||Enrico Pollino was the architect  and Facts and Fiction designed the space.||After Expo 2015 the pavilion was intended to be dismantled and re-erected in Burkina Faso as a Red Cross building|| Exhibitor Magazine best interpretation of theme honorable mention
|-
|

Morocco
||||||2nd or 3rd prize of the World Association of Agronomists
|-
|

Nepal
||||Implementing Expert Group (IEG) (who also designed Nepal's pavilions at the 1988, 1990, 2000 and 2010 expos||Theme Food security and sustainable development||
|-
|

Netherlands
||||Totems Amsterdam||The pavilion is a sort of Luna Park composed of a sequence of spaces of different sizes and colours, each one able to host exhibitions and events in an open, free-flowing arrangement.||Award for "Less expensive and most commercial pavilion"
|-
|

Oman
||||||||
|-
|

Poland
||||Piotr Musiałowski||||
|-
|

Qatar
||||||||Exhibitor Magazine best activity/interactive honorable mention for Interactive Food TableExhibitor Magazine people's choice winner
|-
|

Romania
||||||||
|-
|

Russia
||||Speech Architecture|||| BIE award 3rd place for best installation (over 2000 metres)

|-
|

Slovakia
||
| Karol Kállay||Slovakia. Recharge yourself||
|-
|

Slovenia
||
|SoNo Arhitekti||Theme I feel SLOVENIA. Green, active and healthy||
|-
|

South Korea
||
|Archiban||Theme Hansik, Food for the Future:You are What You Eat. The pavilion is inspired by traditional Korean pottery, being built in the form of an enormous "Moon Jar"
| BIE silver award for exhibition design or for best installation (over 2000 metres)
|-
|

Spain
||||Designed by b720 - Fermín Vázquez Arquitectos||||
|-
|

Switzerland
||||Netwerch||||Exhibitor Magazine best exhibit honorable mention for San Gottardo — Acqua per l'Europa Exhibitor Magazine best interpretation of theme winner

|-
|

Thailand
||||||||
|-
|

Turkey
||||||The pavilion consisted of 3 main divisions of indoor, semi-outdoor and outdoor venues on a total area of 4.170-square-meter, which includes 7 semi-outdoor distinct chambers||
|-
|

United Arab Emirates
||||Foster and Partners|||After Expo 2015 the pavilion is to be demounted and reerected in Masdar City||Exhibitor Magazine best pavilion honorable mention Exhibitor best exterior design winner*Exhibitor Magazine people's choice honorable mention
|-
|

United Kingdom
||||Wolfgang Buttress||The pavilion is called "The Hive"|| Exhibitor Magazine best exhibit winner for The Hive International Jury prize BIE award winner for architecture and landscape (under 2000 metres)

|-
|

United States
||||Designed by Biber Architects||The pavilion is a multi-level building which includes a vertical farm|| Exhibitor Magazine best 'Elements & Detail' winner for Vertical Farm'
|-
|
Vatican City
||||Quattro Associati||Theme Not by Bread Alone. At the Lord's Table with all Mankind|| BIE award winner for theme development (under 2000 metres)

|-
|
Vietnam
||||||Theme Water and Lotus||
|}

Clusters

Expo 2015 was the first universal expo at which countries that didn't self-build were grouped by theme or supply chain rather than geography into one of nine clusters''.

Corporate pavilions
The Milan World Expo had a number of corporate pavilions.

Other pavilions
Almost 50 international organisations participanted in the expo, some had their own pavilions, and some were shared.

References

External links
 Colombia Pavillon Video and Photo gallery

Economy of Milan
Tourist attractions in Milan
World's fair architecture in Italy
Event venues established in 2015
2015 establishments in Italy
World's fairs in Milan